Heinz Klingenberg (6 April 1905, Bielefeld – 12 September 1959, Schweinfurt) was a German film and television actor.

Filmography

External links

1905 births
1959 deaths
German male film actors
Actors from Bielefeld
20th-century German male actors